Mastung Valley is located in Mastung District, Balochistan, Pakistan. It is popular tourist destination in Pakistan.

See also 
 Mastung, Pakistan (town)
 Khwaja Ibrahim Yukpasi

Mastung District